Trenton Township is one of the eighteen townships of Delaware County, Ohio, United States. As of the 2010 United States Census the population was 2,190.

Geography
Located in the eastern part of the county, it borders the following townships:
Porter Township - north
Hilliar Township, Knox County - northeast corner
Hartford Township, Licking County - east
Monroe Township, Licking County - southeast corner
Harlem Township - south
Genoa Township - southwest corner
Berkshire Township - west
Kingston Township - northwest corner

A small part of the village of Sunbury is located in western Trenton Township.

Name and history
Trenton Township was probably named after Trenton, New Jersey.

It is the only Trenton Township statewide.

Government
The township is governed by a three-member board of trustees, who are elected in November of odd-numbered years to a four-year term beginning on the following January 1. Two are elected in the year after the presidential election and one is elected in the year before it. There is also an elected township fiscal officer, who serves a four-year term beginning on April 1 of the year after the election, which is held in November of the year before the presidential election. Vacancies in the fiscal officership or on the board of trustees are filled by the remaining trustees.

Public services
Emergency medical services in Trenton Township are provided by the Delaware County EMS.

References

External links
County website
Community Library in Sunbury

Townships in Delaware County, Ohio
Townships in Ohio